Felice Pastore (August 5, 1786–May 9, 1862) was an Italian nobleman.

Biography 
Felice Pastore Cambon, baron of Rincione was born in Palermo from Don Nicolò and Donna Anna Combon. This Sicilian feudal title was created by the King of Sicily, Francesco I for Nicolò Pastore (Felice's father), who was assigned some manor farms and the feuds of Rincione, Angimbè, Fico and Scalilla.

In 1809 Felice Pastore married Donna Stefania Naselli Montaperto from the princes of Raffadali and the sister of the archbishop of Palermo (from 1853 to 1870) Giovan Battista Naselli.
He was an adopted  citizen of Alcamo, as he spent most of his life in Alcamo; he also was a member of various agricultural colleges, and thanks to his discoveries and the results  of his work, he received a few prizes at the Esposizione Nazionale of Palermo and Florence:
he studied mathematics, physics and letters and, owing to his studies in agriculture, he greatly improved  the production of oils and wines in his lands, by inserting the cultivation of morus.

He was a protagonist of the Sicilian political scenery in the 19th century; his name is linked to the movement of Reformism.
He was very good  tempered, but strong and decisive too: for this reason he had different and important offices. In 1815 he made a long trip together with his wife and described  the encounters and impressions in a Diary  which is an important literary testimony of that period because it refers interesting information about the history of custom and folklore from 1811 until 1862, collected in 21 volumes.

He distinguished himself, above all, for his charities, among which the foundation of the institution Pia Opera Pastore;  in 1837, during the period of  cholera, every day he gave the sum of 800 liras to the Parson for the sufferer and in 1848 he gave a lot of help to the escapees from Messina.

He died in 1862 in Palermo: his wife, Donna Stefania Naselli di Montaperto, had her husband's corpse carried to Alcamo at Church of Saint Mary of Jesus, later, in 1880, it was buried in the chapel of Pia Opera Pastore, the institute  that had been founded by his will in 1860.

He left a great estate for this institution: it was realized in order to give a moral formation, a civic and religious education to the female youth.

Appointments and offices 
 Baron of Rincione, since 1 May 1809
 Senator in Palermo in 1813
 Prefect of Trapani (1818–1820)
 Prefect of Palermo (1821): appointment refused by Pastore.
 Councillor of the Royal Domains beyond the lighthouse  (1824 and 1849)
 Commander (order)  of the Royal Order of Francesco I (1829).
 Lower court magistrate of Palermo (1849).
 Member of various economic institutions.
 Patron and councillor of several charities.
 Promoting member of the "Society of  acclimatization and agriculture".

Diaries 
Diaries from 1827 to 1829 are missing. Surviving diaries include:

 1. Notes concerning baptisms, confirmations, weddings and deaths.
 2. Notes on rites and customs, churches and  religious festivities.
 3. Notes on  di gastronomy.
 4. Notes on empirical medicine.
 5. Notes on animals and empirical veterinary medicine.
 6. Notes on agrarian cultivations (and methods of cultivation). Notes of Oenology.
 7. Notes  on means of transport and  locomotion.
 8. Notes on popular  beliefs.
 9. Notes on a trade fair (not existing any longer).
 10. Notes on games of bocce and billiards.
 11. Notes on traditional uses of sales and contracts.
 12. Notes on operators of trades now missing.

References

Sources 
 Palmeri, Placido: Elogio funebre del barone Felice Pastore Cambon / letto nella Chiesa dei Padri Crociferi addi 14 maggio 1862 giorno dei funerali dal P. D. Placido Palmeri
 Carlo Cataldo: La Casa del Sole p. 141-160; Alcamo ed.campo,1999
 Dott. A. Mango di Casalgerardo: nobiliario di Sicilia, notizie e stemmi relativi alle famiglie nobili siciliane; Palermo, A. Reber, 1912 2 volumi)
 Roberto Calia: La famiglia del Barone Felice Pastore in Alcamo; Trapani, lito-tip. Nuova Radio, 1988

External links 

1862 deaths
1786 births
Nobility from Palermo
Barons of Italy